Middle Dutch is a collective name for a number of closely related West Germanic dialects whose ancestor was Old Dutch. It was spoken and written between 1150 and 1500. Until the advent of Modern Dutch after 1500 or c. 1550, there was no overarching standard language, but all dialects were mutually intelligible. During that period, a rich Medieval Dutch literature developed, which had not yet existed during Old Dutch. The various literary works of the time are often very readable for speakers of Modern Dutch since Dutch is a rather conservative language.

Phonology

Differences with Old Dutch
Several phonological changes occurred leading up to the Middle Dutch period.

(10th or 11th century)
  > 
The outcome is dialect-specific, with  found in more western dialects and  further east. This results in later pairs such as dietsc  versus duitsc .
 Various dialects also show  > , while others retain . Compare southeastern Middle Dutch hiwen  with modern Dutch huwen .
 In word-initial position, some northern dialects also show a change from a falling to a rising diphthong ( > ) like Old Frisian. Cf. the accusative second-person plural pronoun iu  > northern jou  versus southern u .
 Phonemisation of umlaut for back vowels, resulting in a new phoneme  (from earlier Old Dutch  before  or ). Unlike most other Germanic languages, umlaut was only phonemicised for short vowels in all but the easternmost areas; long vowels and diphthongs are unaffected.
 Syllable-final  >  in some areas. This created pairs such as duwen  versus douwen , or nu  versus nou .
 Lowering of  >  when not umlauted.
 This change did not (fully) occur in the southwestern (Flemish) dialects. Hence, these dialects retain sunne "sun" where others have sonne.
In some dialects,  remained syllable-finally or before .
 This change did not occur in Limburgish.
 In Flemish, this change also affected cases that escaped the lowering in the previous change, hence sunne .
 Vowel reduction: Vowels in unstressed syllables are weakened and merge into , spelled . (11th or 12th century) Long vowels seem to have remained as such, at least  is known to have remained in certain suffixes (such as -kijn ).
 Non-phonemic lowering of short ,  > , .
 Open syllable lengthening: Short vowels in stressed open syllables become long. As a result, all stressed syllables in polysyllabic words become heavy. Old Dutch (original) long vowels are called "sharp-long" and indicated with a circumflex (â, ê, î, ô). Lengthened vowels are "soft-long" and are indicated with a macron (ā, ē, ī, ō).
 In most dialects, lengthened  merges with original , but in some, a distinction in backness develops.
 This introduces many length alternations in grammatical paradigms, e.g. singular dag , plural  .
(around 12th century)
 The geminate  (originating from Germanic *-þj-) develops into :  > ,  > .
 L-vocalisation:  and  >  before dentals.
 This change does not occur in Limburgish, which retains the distinction but undergoes its own round of vocalisation in modern times, producing  and  respectively.
 Lengthening of vowels before  + dental consonant. E.g. farth  > vāert , ertha  > āerde , wort  > wōort .
 Syncope of schwa  in certain environments, particularly inflectional endings. This phonemicises the soft-long vowels produced by open syllable lengthening, which can now also occur in closed syllables. E.g. hēvet > hēeft.

Consonants
The consonants of Middle Dutch differed little from those of Old Dutch. The most prominent change is the loss of dental fricatives. The sound  was also phonemicised during this period, judging from loanwords that retain  to this day.

For descriptions of the sounds and definitions of the terms, follow the links on the headings.

Notes:

 All obstruents underwent final-obstruent devoicing as in Old and Modern Dutch.
 During the first part of the Middle Dutch period, geminated varieties of most consonants still occurred.
  were most likely bilabial, whereas  were most likely labiodental.
  could have been either dental  or alveolar .
  had a velar allophone  when it occurred before the velars .
 After ,  was realized as a plosive .
  was most likely alveolar, either a trill  or a tap .

Vowels
Most notable in the Middle Dutch vowel system, when compared to Old Dutch, is the appearance of phonemic rounded front vowels, and the merger of all unstressed short vowels.

Short vowels

  was a back  in most varieties, but front  probably occurred in some western dialects.

Long vowels and diphthongs
Long vowels and diphthongs cannot be clearly distinguished in Middle Dutch, as many long vowels had or developed a diphthongal quality, while existing diphthongs could also develop into monophthongs. Sometimes, this occurred only in restricted dialects, other developments were widespread.

 The rounded front vowels in brackets only occurred in the eastern dialects, where umlaut of long vowels and diphthongs occurred.
 The rounded back vowel  only occurred in the Limburgish dialects.

Many details of the exact phonetics are uncertain, and seemed to have differed by dialect.

The vowels ,  and  developed from Old Dutch opening diphthongs, but their exact character in Middle Dutch is unclear. The following can be said:
 In eastern Brabant, and all of Limburg, the pronunciation remained diphthongal.
  is frequently found written with just , which may indicate a monophthongal pronunciation.  never merged with the long vowel , however, as no rhyme pairs between these vowels are found.
Before velar and labial consonants, the pronunciation was a close .

The opening diphthong pronunciation was probably widespread, and perhaps once universal, as it is nowadays still found in both West Flemish and in Limburgish, at opposite ends of the Middle Dutch language area. In the general area in between, including standard Dutch, the vowels merged with the "soft-long" vowels during the early modern Dutch period.
It's possible that the two vowels merged under some conditions, while remaining distinct in other cases.
In western Brabant, this implies a close monophthongal pronunciation .

They were simple monophthongs in all Middle Dutch dialects, with the exception of western Flanders where  later developed into .

There were two open vowels, with "sharp-long" â developed from the Old Dutch long ā, and "soft-long" ā being the result of lengthening. These two vowels were distinguished only in Limburgish and Low Rhenish at the eastern end, and in western Flemish and coastal Hollandic on the western end. The relative backness of the two vowels was opposite in the two areas that distinguished them.
 In the eastern varieties, â was back , while ā was front or central .  merged into  during Middle Dutch, first in Low Rhenish, then later also in Limburgish further south.
 In all dialects between, the two vowels were not distinguished. The phonetic realisation ranged from back  (in Brabant) to front  (Holland further inland).

The closing diphthong  remained from the corresponding Old Dutch diphthong. It occurred primarily in umlauting environments, with  appearing otherwise. Some dialects, particularly further west, had  in all environments (thus cleene next to cleine). Limburgish preserved the diphthong wherever it was preserved in High German.

The closing diphthong  has two different origins. In the vast majority of the Middle Dutch area, it developed through l-vocalization from older  and  followed by a dental consonant. In the eastern area, Limburg in particular, it was a remnant of the older diphthong as in High German, which had developed into  elsewhere.

Changes during the Middle Dutch period

Phonological changes that occurred during Middle Dutch:

  > ,  > . This eliminated the sound  from the language altogether.
This therefore resulted in alternations such as singular coninc  versus plural coninghe , singular lamp  versus plural lammere .
  >  (spelled  or later ). It is unclear when this change happened, as the spelling does not seem to differentiate the two sounds (that is,  and  could both represent either sound).
  >  before  plus another consonant, merging with original Old Dutch  (< Proto-Germanic ). E.g. ende > einde, pensen > peinsen (from Old French penser). This change is found sporadically in Old Dutch already, but becomes more frequent in some Middle Dutch areas.
E.g. donre > donder, solre > solder, bunre > bunder. In modern Dutch, this change has become grammaticalised for the -er (comparative, agent noun) suffix when attached to a word ending in -r.
 Shortening of geminate consonants, e.g. for bidden  > , which reintroduces stressed light syllables in polysyllabic words.
 The diphthongal quality of these vowels became stronger over time, and eventually the former merged with  ei. But the diphthongal pronunciation was still perceived as unrefined and 'southern' by educated speakers in the sixteenth century, showing that the change had not yet spread to all areas and layers of Dutch society by that time.
 Following the previous change, monophthongisation of opening diphthongs:  > ,  > . The result might have also been a short vowel (as in most Dutch dialects today), but they are known to have remained long at least before .
 Beginning in late Middle Dutch and continuing into the early Modern Dutch period, schwa  was slowly lost word-finally and in some other unstressed syllables: vrouwe > vrouw, hevet > heeft. This did not apply consistently however, and sometimes both forms continued to exist side by side, such as mate and maat.
 Word-final schwa was restored in the past singular of weak verbs, to avoid homophony with the present third-person singular because of word-final devoicing. However, it was lost in all irregular weak verbs, in which this homophony was not an issue: irregular dachte > dacht (present tense denkt), but regular opende did not become *  because it would become indistinguishable from opent.
 During the 15th century at the earliest,   begins to disappear when between a non-short vowel and a schwa.
 The actual outcome of this change differed between dialects. In the southeast, intervocalic  instead often became : mede > meej.
 The change was not applied consistently, and even in modern Dutch today many words have been retained in both forms. In some cases the forms with lost  were perceived as uneducated and disappeared again, such as in Nederland and neer, both from neder (the form Neerland does exist, but is rather archaic in modern Dutch).

Dialects

Middle Dutch was not a single homogeneous language. The language differed by area, with different areas having a different pronunciation and often using different vocabulary. The dialect areas were affected by political boundaries. The sphere of political influence of a certain ruler also created a sphere of linguistic influence, with the language within the area becoming more homogeneous. Following, more or less, the political divisions of the time, several large dialect groups can be distinguished. However, the borders between them were not strong, and a dialect continuum existed between them, with spoken varieties near the edges of each dialect area showing more features of the neighbouring areas.

Middle Dutch has four major dialects groups:
 Flemish in Flanders and Zeeuws in Zeeland,
 Brabantic in Brussels, Leuven, Antwerp, Mechelen, Breda,
 Hollandic in the county of Holland,
 Limburgic in the East.
Flemish, Brabantic and Hollandic are known as West Franconian, while Limburgic is known as East Franconian (not to be confused with the High German dialect East Franconian).

Brabantian

Brabantian was spoken primarily in the Duchy of Brabant. It was an influential dialect during most of the Middle Ages, during the so-called "Brabantian expansion" in which the influence of Brabant was extended outwards into other areas. Compared to the other dialects, Brabantian was a kind of "middle ground" between the coastal areas on one hand, and the Rhineland and Limburg on the other. Brabantian Middle Dutch has the following characteristics compared to other dialects:

 Merger of â and ā, articulated as a back vowel.
 Use of the form  for the second-person plural pronoun.
  > 
 Tended towards Rhinelandic and/or Limburgish in the easternmost areas, with umlaut of long vowels and diphthongs. This in turn led to stronger use of umlaut as a grammatical feature, in for example diminutives.
 Lack of umlaut  >  before , in western varieties.

Flemish

Flemish, consisting today of West and East Flemish and Zeelandic, was spoken in the County of Flanders, northern parts of the County of Artois and areas around the towns of Calais and Boulogne-sur-Mer. Though due to their intermediary position between West Flemish and Brabantian, the East Flemish dialects have also been grouped with the latter. Flemish had been influential during the earlier Middle Ages (the "Flemish expansion") but lost prestige to the neighbouring Brabantian in the 13th century. Its characteristics are:

 Fronted realisation  for â.
 Unrounding of rounded front vowels.
The change is generally limited to West Flemish before dentals, while before labials and velars it is more widespread.
 Lack of umlaut  >  before .
  >  in some words.
  >  sometimes before  + consonant in West Flemish.

Hollandic

Hollandic was spoken in the County of Holland. It was less influential during most of the Middle Ages but became more so in the 16th century during the "Hollandic expansion", during which the Eighty Years' War took place in the south. It shows the following properties:

 Strong Ingvaeonic influence from earlier Frisian presence in the area. This became more apparent closer to the coast and further north (West Friesland).
 â and ā merged and had a fronted articulation (which forms the basis for the modern standard Dutch pronunciation).
 Occasional occurrence of the Ingvaeonic nasal-spirant law. Seen in some place names, such as -mude ("mouth") where more southwestern areas retain the nasal: -monde.
 Use of the form ji for the second-person plural pronoun.
 Lack of umlaut  >  before .

Limburgish

Limburgish was spoken by the people in the provinces of modern Dutch and Belgian Limburg. It was not clearly tied to one political area, instead being divided among various areas, including the Duchy of Limburg (which was south of modern Limburg). It was also the most divergent of the dialects.

 Generally, a strong "southeastern" influence, tying it more to Middle High German in some respects ("Colognian expansion"). The effects of the High German consonant shift are occasionally found.
 Umlaut affects all vowels and is morphologically significant.
 Retention of the older Germanic diphthongs  and  where other Middle Dutch dialects have monophthongized these to ê and ô.
 Orthography is also more eastern.  represents a back vowel, and vowel length in closed syllables is not marked.
 Full use of du as the second-person singular pronoun.

Rhinelandic

Rhinelandic ("Kleverlands") was spoken around the area of the Duchy of Cleves, around the Lower Rhine. It represented a transitional dialect between Limburgish and Middle Low German.

 Like Limburgish, it had an eastern influence, with a more eastern-tinted orthography. Umlaut was a regular grammatical feature.
 Stronger Middle Low German influence.
 Back and often rounded articulation of â, with a tendency to confuse it with ō, a feature shared with Low German, to the north.

Orthography

Middle Dutch was written in the Latin alphabet, which was not designed for writing Middle Dutch so different scribes used different methods of representing the sounds of their language in writing. The traditions of neighbouring scribes and their languages led to a multitude of ways to write Middle Dutch. Consequently, spelling was not standardised but was highly variable and could differ by both time and place as various "trends" in spelling waxed and waned. Furthermore, a word could be found spelled differently in different occurrences within the same text. There was the matter of personal taste, and many writers thought it was more aesthetic to follow French or Latin practice, leading to sometimes rather unusual spellings.

The spelling was generally phonetic, and words were written based on how they were spoken rather than based on underlying phonemes or morphology. Final-obstruent devoicing was reflected in the spelling, and clitic pronouns and articles were frequently joined to the preceding or following word. Scribes wrote in their own dialect, and their spelling reflected the pronunciation of that particular scribe or of some prestige dialect by which the scribe was influenced. Some spellings, such as magd, reflect an early tendency to write the underlying phonemic value. However, by and large, spelling was phonetic, which is logical as people usually read texts out loud.

Modern dictionaries tend to represent words in a normalised spelling to form a compromise between the variable spellings on one hand and to represent the sounds of the language consistently. Thus, normalised spellings attempt to be a general or "average" spelling but still being accurate and true to the language.

Vowels

The general practice was to write long vowels with a single letter in an open syllable and with two letters in a closed syllable. Which two letters were used varied among texts. Some texts, especially those in the east, do not do so and write long vowels with a single letter in all cases (as is the predominant rule in modern German).

Consonants

Grammar

Nouns
Middle Dutch nouns inflected for number as well as case. The weakening of unstressed syllables merged many different Old Dutch classes of nominal declension. The result was a general distinction between strong and weak nouns. Eventually even these started to become confused, with the strong and weak endings slowly beginning to merge into a single declension class by the beginning of the modern Dutch period.

Strong nouns

The strong nouns generally originated from the Old Dutch a-stem, i-stem and u-stem inflections. They mostly had a nominative singular with no ending, and a nominative plural in -e or, for some neuter nouns, with no ending. Most strong nouns were masculine or neuter. Feminines in this class were former i-stems, and could lack an ending in the dative singular, a remnant of the late Old Dutch inflection. In some rare occasions, the genitive singular was also endingless. Some nouns ended in -e in the singular also; these were primarily former ja-stems, which were masculine or neuter. A few were former i-stems with short stems. Nouns of this type tended to be drawn into the weak inflection by analogy.

The following table shows the inflection of the masculine noun  "day", feminine  "deed" and neuter  "bread".

Weak nouns

Weak nouns were characterised by the ending -en throughout the plural. The singular ended in -e.

The following table shows the inflection of the masculine noun  "bow, arc".

Adjectives

Middle Dutch adjectives inflected according to the gender, case and number of the noun they modified.

The Germanic distinction between strong and weak, or indefinite and definite inflection, was fairly minimal in Middle Dutch, appearing only in the masculine and neuter nominative singular. These forms received an -e ending when a definite word (demonstrative, article) preceded, and had no ending otherwise. Adjectives were uninflected when connected through a copula. Thus, even for feminine nouns, no ending appeared: die vrouwe is goet "the lady is good".

Some adjectives, namely the former ja-stems, had an -e even in the strong and copular form, e.g. die vrouwe is cleine "the lady is small".

Pronouns
Middle Dutch pronouns differed little from their modern counterparts. The main differences were in the second person with the development of a T-V distinction. The second-person plural pronoun ghi slowly gained use as a respectful second-person singular form. The original singular pronoun du gradually fell out of use during the Middle Dutch period. A new second person plural pronoun was created by contraction of gij/jij and lui ('people') forming gullie/jullie (literally, 'you people').

Note: There are several other forms.

Determiners

Definite Article
(die, dat = the)

Verbs

Middle Dutch mostly retained the Old Dutch verb system. Like all Germanic languages, it distinguished strong, weak and preterite-present verbs as the three main inflectional classes. Verbs were inflected in present and past tense, and in three moods: indicative, subjunctive and imperative.

The weakening of unstressed vowels affected the distinction between the indicative and subjunctive moods, which had largely been determined by the vowel of the inflectional suffix in Old Dutch. In Middle Dutch, with all unstressed vowels merging into one, the subjunctive became distinguished from the indicative only in the singular but was identical to it in the plural, and also in the past tense of weak verbs. That led to a gradual decline in the use of the subjunctive, and it has been all but lost entirely in modern Dutch.

Strong verbs
The seven classes of strong verb common to the Germanic languages were retained. The four principal parts were the present tense, first- and third-person singular past tense, remaining past tense, and the past participle.

In classes 6 and 7, there was no distinction between the two different vowels of the past tense. In classes 4 and 5, the difference was primarily one of length, since ā and â were not distinguished in most dialects. The difference between ê and ē, and between ô and ō, found in classes 1 and 2, was a bit more robust, but also eventually waned in the development to modern Dutch. Consequently, the distinction was mostly lost. Class 3, which retained a clear distinction that did not rely on vowel length, was levelled in favour of the o of the plural.

In classes with a lengthened vowel in the present, the singular imperative often appears with a short vowel instead, e.g. les, drach. An alternative form, with final -e by analogy with the weak verbs, also occurs.

The eastern dialects occasionally show i in the second- and third-person singular present indicative forms, instead of e. This is a remnant of older i-mutation in these forms. Umlaut is also sometimes found in the past subjunctive in the east.

Weak verbs
Middle Dutch retained weak verbs as the only productive class of verbs. While Old Dutch still had two different classes of weak verbs (and remnants of a third), this distinction was lost in Middle Dutch with the weakening of unstressed syllables.

The past tense was formed with a suffix -ed-, which generally lost its e through syncope and thus came to be directly attached to the preceding stem. This triggered voicing assimilation, so that t appeared whenever the preceding stem ended in a voiceless consonant. This phenomenon remains in modern Dutch. Unsyncopated forms, which retain the fuller suffix -ed-, are sometimes found, especially with stems ending in a labial or velar consonant.

Some former class 1 weak verbs retained so-called Rückumlaut. These verbs had undergone umlaut in the present tense, but the umlaut-triggering vowel was syncopated in the past tense already in Old Dutch, preventing umlaut from taking hold there. Thus, senden had the first- and third-person singular past tense sande. These verbs tended to be reinterpreted as strong verbs in later Middle Dutch; sande itself gave rise to the modern zond, mirroring strong class 3.

Literature

Notes

External links

Middle Dutch text database (TITUS)
Grammatical information on Middle Dutch (in Dutch)
Spoken examples of Old Dutch, Middle Dutch and Old Frisian (in Dutch)

 
History of the Dutch language
Languages attested from the 12th century
Low Franconian languages
Dutch, Middle